Hugo Ángel Tedesco (born 20 February 1947) is a former Argentine football midfielder.

Career
Tedesco began playing football with Club Atlético Huracán, helping the club reach the 1969 Copa Argentina quarter-finals. In 1971, Bailetti moved abroad to play for Atlante F.C. in the Primera División de México for five seasons.

Tedesco returned to Argentina in 1976, finishing his career with Estudiantes de La Plata, Club Atlético Temperley and All Boys.

Tedesco made one appearance for the Argentina national football team, a friendly against Mexico in August 1967.

References

External links
 
 
 

1947 births
Living people
Argentine footballers
Argentine expatriate footballers
Argentina international footballers
Club Atlético Huracán footballers
Estudiantes de La Plata footballers
Club Atlético Temperley footballers
All Boys footballers
Argentine Primera División players
Atlante F.C. footballers
Liga MX players
Expatriate footballers in Mexico
Association football midfielders